The Oceanic Shoals Marine Park (formerly known as the Oceanic Shoals Commonwealth Marine Reserve) is an Australian marine park offshore of the Northern Territory, near of Darwin. It is the largest of the 8 parks managed under the North Marine Parks Network.

Conservation values

Species and habitat
Important resting area for turtles between egg laying (internesting area), for the threatened flatback turtle and olive ridley turtle.
Important foraging area for the threatened loggerhead turtle and olive ridley turtle.

Bioregions and ecology
Examples of the ecosystems of two provincial bioregions: the Northwest Shelf Transition Province (which includes the Bonaparte, Oceanic Shoals, and Tiwi meso-scale bioregions) and the Timor Transition Province.
Carbonate bank and terrace system of the Van Diemen Rise (unique sea-floor feature).
Carbonate banks of the Joseph Bonaparte Gulf (enhanced productivity, high biodiversity, unique sea-floor feature).
Pinnacles of the Bonaparte Basin (enhanced productivity, unique sea-floor feature).
Shelf break and slope of the Arafura Shelf (unique sea-floor feature).

History
The marine park was proclaimed under the EPBC Act on 14 December 2013 and renamed Oceanic Shoals Marine Park on 9 October 2017. The management plan and protection measures of the marine park came into effect for the first time on 1 July 2018.

Summary of protection zones
The Oceanic Shoals Marine Park has been assigned IUCN protected area category VI. However, within the marine park there are four protection zones, each zone has an IUCN category and related rules for managing activities to ensure the protection of marine habitats and species.

The following table is a summary of the zoning rules within the Oceanic Shoals Marine Park:

See also

 Protected areas managed by the Australian government

References

External links
 North Marine Parks Network - Parks Australia
 North Marine Parks Network - environment.gov.au (outdated)

Australian marine parks